Broomyshaw is a village in Staffordshire, England. Population details for the 2011 census can be found under Waterhouses, Staffordshire

Villages in Staffordshire